Karel Bonsink (born 21 September 1950) is a Dutch football manager and former professional player. He coaches FC Hilversum.

Playing career
In the course of his career Bonsink has played as a forward for DWS, FC Utrecht, RFC Liège, RWDM, Ajax, Stade Rennais F.C. and Seiko SA.

Managerial career
Bonsink has managed FC Abcoude, AGOVV, HFC Haarlem and since 2001 is a coach at FC Hilversum, competing in the Topklasse since 2010, where one of his sons was active as a player.

On 10 November 2013, it was announced that Bonsink would take a managerial position with West African side AS Dragons from Benin. This however faltered due to negotiations with his manager Humprey Nijman at the time. He returned to Hilversum in 2015.

Honours

Club
Ajax
Eredivisie: 1979–80

Seiko
Hong Kong First Division League: 1982–83

References

1950 births
Living people
Footballers from Amsterdam
Association football forwards
Dutch footballers
AFC DWS players
FC Utrecht players
RFC Liège players
R.W.D. Molenbeek players
AFC Ajax players
Stade Rennais F.C. players
Seiko SA players
Eredivisie players
Belgian Pro League players
Ligue 1 players
Hong Kong First Division League players
Dutch expatriate footballers
Expatriate footballers in Belgium
Expatriate footballers in France
Expatriate footballers in Hong Kong
Dutch expatriate sportspeople in Belgium
Dutch expatriate sportspeople in France
Dutch expatriate sportspeople in Hong Kong
Dutch football managers
AGOVV Apeldoorn managers
HFC Haarlem managers
FC Hilversum managers
20th-century Dutch people